Duchaussoy is a French surname. Notable people with the surname include:

 Herménégilde Duchaussoy (1854–1934), French meteorologist
 Jacques Duchaussoy (1905–1995), French author
 Michel Duchaussoy (1938–2012), French film actor

French-language surnames